Wilfred Jackson (January 24, 1906 – August 7, 1988) was an American animator, arranger, composer and director best known for his work on the Mickey Mouse and Silly Symphonies series of cartoons and the Night on Bald Mountain/Ave Maria segment of Fantasia from Walt Disney Productions. He was also instrumental in developing the system with which Disney added music and sound to Steamboat Willie, the first Mickey Mouse cartoon. 

Several of the Silly Symphony shorts he directed, including The Old Mill (1937), won Academy Awards during the 1930s. Starting with Snow White and the Seven Dwarfs in 1937, he directed sequences in many of the major Disney animated features up to Lady and the Tramp in 1955, including all of the animated sequences in Song of the South (1946). He later moved into television, producing and directing for Disney's Disneyland series. After continuing health issues, he retired in 1961. Jackson died at age 82 in 1988.

Jackson attended Otis Art Institute (now called Otis College of Art and Design) in the 1920s.

Filmography

References

External links

1906 births
1988 deaths
American animators
American animated film directors
Directors of Golden Bear winners
Fantasy film directors
Walt Disney Animation Studios people
Artists from Chicago
Directors of Best Animated Short Academy Award winners
Disney Legends